A Little Game is a 1971 ABC Movie of the Week that was first broadcast on October 30, 1971, starring Mark Gruner as a young boy who will do anything to get what he wants. In the movie, the plot suggests that he might be responsible for the death of a fellow student at the military academy he attends, yet his mother (Diane Baker) refuses to believe that he could be guilty of anything. His stepfather (Ed Nelson) begins to wonder if the boy wants to get rid of him. It was based on the 1968 novel of the same name by Fielden Farrington, who also wrote the screenplay. The film was directed by Paul Wendkos, who would film another of Farrington's novels for television the following year (The Strangers in 7A).

Cast
 Diane Baker as Elaine Hamilton
 Ed Nelson as Paul Hamilton
 Howard Duff as Dunlap
 Katy Jurado as Laura
 Mark Gruner as Robert Mueller
 Christopher Shea as Stu Parker
 Helen Kleeb as Secretary
 Jason Fithian as Clubber

See also
 List of American films of 1971

References

External links

ABC Movie of the Week
1971 television films
1971 films
1971 drama films
Films directed by Paul Wendkos
Films based on American novels
Films scored by Robert Prince